Robert Wilfred Fairey Jesson (17 June 1886 – 22 February 1917) was an English cricketer, a right-handed batsman who was a leg break bowler.

Jesson was born in Southampton, the son of solicitor's clerk Robert Jesson. He was educated at Sherborne School, where he represented the school cricket team, and at Merton College, Oxford.

Jesson made his first-class debut for Hampshire against Warwickshire in the 1907 County Championship. On debut he took his maiden and only first-class five wicket haul, with figures of 5/42. He played for Hampshire in 11 first-class matches in 1907.

In 1908 Jesson played a single first-class match for Oxford University against the Marylebone Cricket Club. He also played two first-class matches for Hampshire against Warwickshire and Northamptonshire that year.

Two years later in 1910, Jesson played his final first-class match for Hampshire against Sussex. In his first-class career, he scored 198 runs at a batting average of 8.25, with a high score of 38. With the ball he took 21 wickets at a bowling average of 25.14. All of his wickets came for Hampshire.

Jesson served in the First World War with the Wiltshire Regiment, where he held the rank of Major. Jesson fought in the Mesopotamian campaign, where on 22 February 1917 he was killed in action.

References

External links
Robert Jesson at Cricinfo
Robert Jesson at CricketArchive
Jesson family tree

1886 births
1917 deaths
Military personnel from Southampton
Cricketers from Southampton
People educated at Sherborne School
Alumni of Merton College, Oxford
English cricketers
Hampshire cricketers
Oxford University cricketers
British Army personnel of World War I
Wiltshire Regiment officers
British military personnel killed in World War I